Aristotle and Dante Discover the Secrets of the Universe is a coming-of-age young adult novel by American author Benjamin Alire Sáenz which was first published February 21, 2012. Set in El Paso, Texas in 1987, the novel follows two Mexican-American teenagers, Aristotle "Ari" Mendoza and Dante Quintana, their friendship, and their struggles with racial and ethnic identity, sexuality, and family relationships. Since its publication, the novel has received widespread critical acclaim and numerous accolades. 

A sequel, titled Aristotle and Dante Dive into the Waters of the World, was published on October 12, 2021. A film adaptation, written and directed by Aitch Alberto, premiered on September 9, 2022.

Plot
In the summer of 1987, 15-year-old Aristotle Mendoza meets a boy named Dante Quintana at the local pool. The boys bond over their classical names and eventually become inseparable. Dante teaches Ari about literature and poetry, while Ari is fascinated by Dante's swimming ability and sincerity. 

Dante tells Ari that he and his family are moving to Chicago for the next school term because his father was offered a temporary professorship at the University of Chicago. That same day, the two boys see a bird lying injured in the road. While Dante goes into the road to check on the bird, a car speeds around the corner. Ari dives into the street and pushes Dante out of its path, saving his life. While Dante leaves almost unscathed, Ari is hurt very badly. Following the accident, the Quintanas and the Mendozas grow closer. Both boys' mothers talk more frequently and share ideas about their sons.

Before Dante leaves for Chicago, he tells Ari that the two things he loves most in the world are swimming and Ari. However, Ari says that he should not tell him those things, even if they are true. The two boys promise each other that they will still be friends when Dante returns in the summer.

Over the next year, Dante sends Ari several letters detailing his life in Chicago and struggling with his sexuality. Ari learns to drive, falls in love with a girl from school, and searches for answers to his questions about his brother Bernardo, who is in prison for reasons no one in his family will discuss.

The next summer, Dante convinces Ari to kiss him as an experiment. It becomes increasingly clear that Dante is in love with Ari, who appears not to reciprocate Dante's feelings for him.

Ari's father announces that his Aunt Ophelia had had a fatal stroke. At the funeral, Ari realizes that none of his extended family is there. He is told that they disapproved of Aunt Ophelia having lived with another woman for many years. After the funeral, Ari's mother explains that Ari's brother, Bernardo, was arrested for the murder of a prostitute he hired when he was 15 years old. When Bernardo found out the prostitute was transgender, he killed her with his bare fists.

When Ari returns home, Mr. Quintana tells him that Dante is in the hospital. He was jumped by several young men who had seen him kissing his boyfriend Daniel in an alley. Ari tracks down Julian, one of the boys who attacked Dante, at the body shop where he works and starts a fight with him. Mr. Quintana asks if Ari knows why Dante was jumped. Ari tells him that Dante is gay and was kissing another boy. Mr. Quintana admits that he'd guessed the truth because of the way Dante looks at Ari, while Mrs. Quintana tells Ari she thinks Dante is in love with him and that Daniel is just a stand-in for Ari.

Ari's mother eventually calls a family meeting, where Ari finally accepts that he is as much in love with Dante as Dante is with him. That night, the two families go bowling together. After bowling, Dante and Ari go out into the desert, where Ari kisses Dante, fully accepting his love for him. Now free of his fears, Ari is left wondering: "How could I have ever been ashamed of loving Dante Quintana?"

Themes
Several themes feature prominently in Aristotle and Dante. These include Mexican-American identity, gender and sexuality, particular masculine gender roles and homosexuality, intellectualism and artistic expression, as well as family relationships and friendship.

Critical reception
The book has been a critical success, consistently ranking as one of the best contemporary young adult fiction novels, and has garnered numerous positive reviews from Kirkus Reviews, School Library Journal, The Horn Book Magazine, and Voice of Youth Advocates (VOYA).

A Publishers Weekly review calling it "a tender, honest exploration of identity and sexuality, and a passionate reminder that love—whether romantic or familial—should be open, free, and without shame."

The book has been positively received by readers as well; in May 2016, more than four years after its publication, it ranked first on a list of popular LGBT fiction on Goodreads.

In an interview with NPR, Sáenz himself noted that "I've never had a book with this kind of response, not ever" and notes that "[Ari] is so afraid of loving [Dante]. And Dante isn't."

The book received the following accolades:

 Amelia Elizabeth Walden Award finalist (2013)
 Lambda Literary Award winner for LGBT Children's/Young Adult (2013)
 Stonewall Book Award for LGBT Fiction (2013)
 Pura Belpré Narrative Medal for Latino fiction (2013)
 Michael L. Printz Award honor for Young Adult fiction (2013)
 American Library Association (ALA) Best Fiction for Young Adults top ten pick (2013)
 ALA Rainbow List (2013)
 American Library Services for Children (ALSA) Notable Children's Books (2013)
 School Library Journal Best Children's Books (2012)
 Kirkus Reviews Best Teen Books (2012)
 Junior Library Guild selection

Sequel 

Sáenz announced in 2016 that there would be a sequel titled There Will Be Other Summers. In 2020, Sáenz tweeted that he had finished the sequel, but had changed the title. In February 2021, it was announced that the sequel will be published by Simon and Schuster with the title Aristotle and Dante Dive into the Waters of the World. The book was published on October 12, 2021.

Adaptations 

An audiobook version of the novel was released in April 2013. Read by Lin-Manuel Miranda, it has a total running time of 7 hours and 29 minutes.

Plans for the book to be adapted for the screen began in 2016, and were in motion by 2018 with filmmaker Aitch Alberto penning the script. In October 2021, it was announced that the film adaptation of the novel would be directed by Alberto in her directorial debut, and would star Max Pelayo and Reese Gonzales as the titular characters, along with Eugenio Derbez, Eva Longoria, Verónica Falcón, Isabella Gomez, Luna Blaise, and Kevin Alejandro. Filming took place from October to November 2021, and the film had its premiere on September 9, 2022 at the 47th International Toronto Film Festival.

See also 

 Chicano literature

References

Gay male teen fiction
Hispanic and Latino American novels
2012 American novels
American young adult novels
American LGBT novels
Lambda Literary Award-winning works
Mexican-American literature
American bildungsromans
LGBT-related young adult novels
2010s LGBT novels
Stonewall Book Award-winning works
Simon & Schuster books
2012 LGBT-related literary works